The Vaughan Baronetcy, of Nannau in the County of Merioneth, was a title in the Baronetage of Great Britain. It was created on 28 July 1791 for Robert Howell Vaughan. He was a descendant of Robert Vaughan, the antiquary. The second Baronet was Member of Parliament for Merioneth for over forty years. The title became extinct on the death of the third Baronet in 1859.

Vaughan baronets, of Nannau (1791)
Sir Robert Howell Vaughan, 1st Baronet (–1792)
Sir Robert Williames Vaughan, 2nd Baronet (c. 1768–1843)
Sir Robert Williames Vaughan, 3rd Baronet (1803–1859)

References

Extinct baronetcies in the Baronetage of Great Britain